Howard-Williams Point is a prominent point extending into the Ross Ice Shelf, located just north of Beaumont Bay, north east of the Surveyors Range, Antarctica. It was named in honor of Clive Howard-Williams, an ecologist who led several research events in the McMurdo Dry Valleys, Darwin Glacier, and Bratina Island areas from 1984 onwards. Howard-Williams was an Antarctica New Zealand Board member 1996–2000, and provided considerable input to international Antarctic science and environmental management, including development of a McMurdo Dry Valleys Antarctic Specially Managed Area. He went on to become the Scientific Committee on Antarctic Research (SCAR) delegate for New Zealand and also one of the four SCAR Vice-Presidents.

References

Headlands of Antarctica
Shackleton Coast